"We Can Get Together" is the second single released by the Australian rock band Flowers, later known as Icehouse. It was released in September 1980, on the independent label Regular Records from their first album, Icehouse, two weeks before the album itself was released. It peaked at #16 on the Australian Kent Music Report Singles Charts.

Following their signing with Chrysalis Records in early 1981 for the European, Japanese, UK and US releases Flowers had to change their name due to legal restrictions preventing confusion with a Scottish group The Flowers. "We Can Get Together" was released in the UK on Chrysalis in 1981 under the band name Icehouse as both a 7" and 10" vinyl single and later in the US as a 7" single. A remix version by sonicanimation was released on the Icehouse album Meltdown in 2002.

Reception
In a single review Cash Box magazine said the group "can sound an awful lot like Television's Tom Verlaine at times here or an upbeat Gary Numan."

Track listing
All tracks written by Iva Davies unless otherwise shown.

7" single (Australian release)
 "We Can Get Together" - 3:37
 "Paradise Lost" - 5:54

7" single (UK release)
 "We Can Get Together"
 "Send Somebody" (Iva Davies, Michael Hoste)

10" single (UK release)
 "We Can Get Together"
 "Send Somebody" (Iva Davies, Michael Hoste)
 "Paradise Lost"

7" single (US release)
 "We Can Get Together"
 "Not My Kind"

7" single (Europe release)
 "We Can Get Together" (Edit)
 "Icehouse"

Charts

Weekly charts

Year-end charts

References

1980 singles
Icehouse (band) songs
Music videos directed by Russell Mulcahy
1980 songs
Songs written by Iva Davies
Chrysalis Records singles
Regular Records singles